The 1977 La Flèche Wallonne was the 41st edition of La Flèche Wallonne cycle race and was held on 7 April 1977. The race started and finished in Verviers. The race was won by Francesco Moser of the Sanson team.

General classification

Notes

References

1977 in road cycling
1977
1977 in Belgian sport
1977 Super Prestige Pernod